Caterina Banti (born 13 June 1987) is an Italian sailor who specializes in the Nacra 17 category. She and Ruggero Tita won two medals at the Nacra 17 World Championship, gold in 2018 and bronze in 2017, and three gold medals at the Nacra 17 European Championship, between 2017 and 2020. They were nominated by the Italian Sailing Federation (FIV) to compete at the 2020 Summer Olympics.

At the postponed Tokyo 2020 Summer Olympics, they raced their boat at Enoshima alongside their British training partners of Anna Burnet and John Gimson. They beat them into second place and were awarded with gold medals.

She holds a bachelor degree in Foreign Languages at the La Sapienza University of Rome.

References

External links
 
 
 

1987 births
Living people
Sportspeople from Rome
Italian female sailors (sport)
Olympic gold medalists for Italy
Olympic sailors of Italy
Olympic medalists in sailing
Sailors at the 2020 Summer Olympics – Nacra 17
Medalists at the 2020 Summer Olympics